Arlington Park is a race track in Arlington Heights, Illinois.

Arlington Park may also refer to:
Arlington Park (Metra), a Metra station near Arlington Park
Arlington Park (novel), a 2006 novel by Rachel Cusk
 Arlington Business Park, a Goodman business park in Reading, England
 Arlington Memorial Park, a cemetery in Hudson County, New Jersey

See also
Arlington Park Northwest Dallas